A spore is an asexual biological reproductive mechanism.

Spore may also refer to:

Video games
Spore (1987 video game), a game for the Commodore 64 and ZX Spectrum
Spore (1991 video game), a video game for MS-DOS
Spore (2008 video game), a video game by Maxis

Music
The Spore, a 2005 album by Opiate for the Masses
Spore (band), an American rock band
"Spore", a 2015 song by Scottish musician Momus from his album Turpsycore

Publication
Spore (agricultural publication), a magazine published by CTA

Technology
Security Protocols Open Repository

Other uses
S'pore, common popular abbreviation for Singapore
Spore (Phrygia), a town of ancient Phrygia, now in Turkey
Spore, West Pomeranian Voivodeship, a village in Poland
Galaxy of Fear: Spore, a book by John Whitman

See also
Diaspore (botany), a plant disseminule
Endospore, a hardy bacterial non-reproductive survival structure
Spore-like cells, a specific class of stem cells
Spore print, a diagnostic character for identifying mushrooms
Resting spore, created by fungi
Milky spore, a bacterium of the white grubs of Japanese beetles
Bacterial morphological plasticity, bacteria changing into spores